is a novel by , first published as a book in 1859. Before its release as a novel, the work was serialized in A marmota, a newspaper published in the state of Rio de Janeiro.

The novel concerns the star-crossed romance between a Portuguese girl and Indigenous boy in colonial Brazil. Matthews describes the work as Indianist; Andreta and Alós note, similarly, that the work evinces a preference for the Indigenous peoples in Brazil over conquistadors. De Alencar argues that it represents a precursor to modernism in Brazilian literature. Wasserman compares it to the French novels Paul et Virginie (1788) and Atala (1801), as well as to the works of Brazilian writer José de Alencar such as O Guarani (1857)—although she notes that, unlike O Guarani, D. Narcisa de Villar does not "complicate moral matters" by describing Indigenous people in negative terms or Portuguese colonialists in positive terms.

Notes

Sources 
 
 
 

1859 books
19th-century Brazilian novels
Brazilian romance novels
Portuguese-language novels